Dario Cologna (born 11 March 1986) is a Swiss cross-country skier. He has four overall World Cup victories, four Olympic gold medals, one World Championships gold medal and four Tour de Ski victories in his career.

On 3 November 2021, he announced his retirement from cross-country skiing following the 2021–2022 season.

Early life
Cologna is a native Rumantsch speaker. He was born in Santa Maria Val Müstair, in the Lower Engadine, to Italian parents. His father Remo is from Val di Non in Trentino, while his mother Christine is from Stelvio/Stilfs in South Tyrol.

He holds both Italian and Swiss citizenship.

He is the older brother of Swiss skier Gianluca Cologna.

Career

Early career and the breakthrough 2008–09 season
In 2006, Dario Cologna won a bronze medal at the 10 km classic event in the Junior World Championships in Kranj, Slovenia. Cologna debuted in the FIS Cross-Country World Cup in Kuusamo in November 2006 and took his first points in Falun in March 2007. During the 2007–08 season, Cologna finished in the top ten four times and placed 37th overall.

In December 2008, Cologna took his first World Cup podium finish with second place in the 30-kilometre competition in La Clusaz. On 27 December, he won his first World Cup race as he finished first on the 15 km classic pursuit on stage two of the 2008–09 Tour de Ski. He went on to win the Tour in January 2009, finishing the final event almost a minute ahead of runner-up Petter Northug. Cologna also won the overall 2008–09 World Cup with more than 100 points in front of the second place after placing two times first and other three times on the podium.

2010 and 2014 Olympics
He finished the 2009–10 FIS Cross-Country World Cup fourth, winning a race and taking two other podiums. He also came in third in the 2009–10 Tour de Ski. In the Vancouver 2010 Winter Olympics, he won the gold medal in the men's 15km freestyle event. Cologna is the first Swiss to win a cross-country skiing gold medal at the Winter Olympics.

Cologna won the 2010–11 FIS Cross-Country World Cup with more than 300 points ahead of Petter Northug, who came second. This season he won four races and took six other podiums, winning the 2010–11 Tour de Ski with 27 seconds ahead of Northug.

During the 2011–12 FIS Cross-Country World Cup season, Cologna won eight races and took twelve additional podium positions; his 20 podiums are, as of the 2018–19 season, still a record for most podiums in a season. On 8 January 2012, Cologna took his third Tour de Ski overall win in Val di Fiemme, winning the 2011–12 Tour de Ski. He finished more than a minute ahead of everyone else, with Marcus Hellner being second and Petter Northug third. With this performance, Cologna won his third Tour de Ski overall win, being the only male athlete ever to have done so. He also snatched the yellow jersey becoming world no. 1 in the 2011–12 FIS Cross-Country World Cup as of 8 January 2012.

At the World Championships 2013 in Val di Fiemme Cologna won the 30 km pursuit.

He won the 30 km skiathlon at the Sochi Olympics. Later in the games he successfully defended his title from the Vancouver Olympics in the 15 km race, this time in classic technique.

2017–18 season: Fourth Tour de Ski and third consecutive Olympic 15 km
Cologna won his fourth Tour de Ski title by winning the 2017–18 edition. He won two of the six stages of the Tour, both in Lenzerheide, and won the overall standings with a margin of one minute and 26.5 seconds to second-placed Martin Johnsrud Sundby. Alongside female skier Justyna Kowalczyk, Cologna is the only athlete to win the Tour de Ski four times. At the PyeongChang Olympics, Cologna won the 15 kilometre freestyle. He became the first cross-country skier to win three consecutive 15 km Olympic events. On 10 March 2018, he became the first Swiss to win the prestigious Holmenkollen 50 km.

He was awarded the Holmenkollen Medal in 2021.

Cross-country skiing results
All results are sourced from the International Ski Federation (FIS).

Olympic Games
 4 medals – (4 gold)

Distance reduced to 30 km due to weather conditions.

World Championships
 3 medals – (1 gold, 2 silver)

World Cup

Season titles
 8 titles – (4 overall, 4 distance)

Season standings

Individual podiums

 26 victories – (15 , 11 ) 
 73 podiums – (40 , 33 )

Team podiums
 1 victory – (1 ) 
 2 podiums – (2 )

References

External links

 
 
 
 

1986 births
Cross-country skiers at the 2010 Winter Olympics
Cross-country skiers at the 2014 Winter Olympics
Cross-country skiers at the 2018 Winter Olympics
Cross-country skiers at the 2022 Winter Olympics
Living people
Olympic cross-country skiers of Switzerland
Olympic gold medalists for Switzerland
Swiss male cross-country skiers
Olympic medalists in cross-country skiing
Medalists at the 2010 Winter Olympics
Medalists at the 2014 Winter Olympics
Medalists at the 2018 Winter Olympics
FIS Nordic World Ski Championships medalists in cross-country skiing
FIS Cross-Country World Cup champions
Tour de Ski winners
Tour de Ski skiers
Swiss people of Italian descent
People from Inn District, Switzerland
Sportspeople from Graubünden